Ballistic nylon is a thick, tough, nylon fabric with several uses. Ballistic nylon was developed by the DuPont corporation as a material for flak jackets to be worn by World War II airmen. The term ballistic nylon originates in the fabric's intended function, protecting its wearers from flying debris and fragmentation caused by bullet and artillery-shell impacts.

Description 
The original specification for ballistic nylon was an 18 ounce nylon fabric made from 1050 denier high tenacity nylon yarn in a 2×2 basketweave. Today the term is often used to refer to any nylon fabric that is made with a "ballistic weave", typically a 2×2 or 2×3 basketweave. It can be woven from nylon yarns of various denier such as 840 denier and 1680 denier.

Origin 
Ballistic nylon was originally developed by the Dupont corporation for flak jackets for World War II airmen. The name of this nylon speaks to its origin;  its intent was to protect the airmen from flying debris and fragmentation caused by bullet and artillery-shell impacts. The nylon type was not effective against most pistol and rifle bullets, let alone the heavy 20 mm and 30 mm autocannons Axis powers were often armed with. Thus ballistic nylon was replaced by Kevlar and other more bullet-resistant fabrics.

Modern uses 
Although ballistic nylon was originally created and used in flak jackets, its durability and cutting resistance have made it useful for non-combat applications. It can be found in backpacks, luggage, belts and straps, motorcycle jackets, watch bands, and knife sheaths. It can also be used for structural purposes, such as on skin-on-frame kayaks.

Ballistic nylon is used in chainsaw protective chaps covering the fronts of the chainsaw operator's legs. Such chaps are usually made with an outer layer of a tough smooth fabric like nylon or other synthetic fiber, with four plies of ballistic nylon inside. When the moving chainsaw chain contacts the chaps and tears the external layer, the inner plies shred. The strength of the ballistic nylon fiber will generally stop the moving chain quickly by causing the drive clutch to slip.  As a result, the operator is relatively or completely uninjured by the chain.

Due to its difficulty in dyeing, most products that use ballistic nylon will be found in black or other dark colors.

See also
 Cordura
 Ripstop nylon

References

Body armor
Woven fabrics